San Geronimo Valley is located in Marin County, California, composed of four unincorporated towns: Woodacre, San Geronimo, Forest Knolls, and Lagunitas.  It is a fairly close-knit community, with a rather liberal citizenry.  The farther west one goes along the valley, the more forested the land becomes. The valley is bisected roughly east-to-west by Sir Francis Drake Boulevard; a number of streets in the towns along this road were constructed on the former right-of-way of the Northwestern Pacific Railroad. The valley has numerous hiking/biking trails.  Most of the residents reside on the south, shadier, side of the valley.  

The San Geronimo Valley derives its name from the San Geronimo Ranch, established by Adolph Mailliard and Ann Eliza Ward in 1868, where they bred thoroughbred horses, including the famous stallion Monday, who sired most of the race horses in California.

The Valley is part of the Lagunitas School District, unique in that it operates two alternative elementary programs and a traditional middle school program on two connected campuses with one superintendent, one principal, and one school board. Each elementary program (Open Classroom, Montessori-inspired) has its own unique philosophy and pedagogical methods, all working within the framework of the California professional and academic standards. Each program involves parent participation to some degree.

The main businesses in the Valley are the Papermill Saloon in Forest Knolls, Arti Cafe, Woodacre Market and Deli, and the Lagunitas Grocery, though there are numerous others. Woodacre is home to Spirit Rock Meditation Center, dedicated to the teachings of Buddha and Vipasannā mediation; Dickson Ranch, and the Marin County Fire Department headquarters. San Geronimo Valley also comprises the greater part of the Lagunitas Watershed, in which some of the last remaining coho salmon spawn. The San Geronimo Valley Community Center, attached to the school district, is a hub for community events and hosts the local food bank.

References

See also
 San Geronimo Creek

West Marin
Valleys of Marin County, California